Vrudhanmare Sookshikkuka is a 1995 Malayalam film by Sunil, starring Jayaram, Dileep and Harisree Ashokan.

Plot
Friends Sathyaraj and Dharmaraj, disguised as two old men, go to the Rose Hotel owned by Hema. There is a hostage crisis at Rose Hotel. It is up to Hema's fiancé Vijay Krishnan to save the people.

Cast

Jayaram as Vijay Krishnan
Dileep as Sathyaraj / K. P. Nair
Harisree Ashokan as Dharmaraj / Daniel M D'Souza
Khushboo Sundar as Hema
Jagathy Sreekumar as Rudran Pillai
Karamana Janardanan Nair as Retired Judge Goda Varma
K. T. S. Padannayil as Phalgunan
V. K. Sreeraman as Major
Mammukoya as Home Minister
Kuthiravattam Pappu as Sundaresan Nair
M. S. Thripunithura as Warrier
Prathapachandran as Police Officer
N. L. Balakrishnan as Retired IG Santhasundaran Pillai
Krishnankutty Nair as Bheemasena Kurup
K.P.A.C. Lalitha as Bhageerathi Thampuratti
Philomina as Margaret
Adoor Bhavani as Pankajavalli
Adoor Pankajam as Kusumavalli
Poojappura Ravi as Swamy
Jose Pellissery as Novelist Kanjikuzhi Chakko
Paravoor Bharathan as Pachu
T. P. Madhavan as Thirumala Thommichan
Kozhikode Narayanan Nair as Retired Principal Jose Arani
Kunjandi as Abdul Rahman
Ananya
Kaduvakkulam Antony as Kandamkulam Kesavan
Thodupuzha Vasanthi as Mrs Sundaresan Nair
Lalithasree
Trichur Elsi
Kumarakom Raghunath
Anila Sreekumar
 Charulatha aka Kukku Singh
 Aroma Sunilkumar as Balu

References

External links
 

1990s Malayalam-language films
1995 comedy films
1995 films
Films directed by Sunil
Films scored by Berny–Ignatius